The 1980–81 Balkans Cup was an edition of the Balkans Cup, a football competition for representative clubs from the Balkan states. It was contested by 6 teams and Velež Mostar won the trophy.

Group A

Group B

Final

|+Summary

First leg

Second leg

Velež Mostar won 12–7 on aggregate.

References

External links
RSSSF Archive → Balkans Cup

Mehmet Çelik. "Balkan Cup". Turkish Soccer

1980
1980–81 in European football
1981–82 in European football
1980–81 in Romanian football
1981–82 in Romanian football
1980–81 in Greek football
1981–82 in Greek football
1980–81 in Bulgarian football
1981–82 in Bulgarian football
1980–81 in Turkish football
1981–82 in Turkish football
1980–81 in Yugoslav football
1981–82 in Yugoslav football
1980–81 in Albanian football
1981–82 in Albanian football